Miloš Alexander Bazovský (1899 in Turany nad Váhom – 1968 in Trenčín) was an eminent Slovak painter, often ranked among the most prominent figures of 20th-century art from Slovakia.

Selected solo exhibitions
Miloš Alexander Bazovský, Slovak National Gallery, Bratislava, Slovakia, 1960
Miloš Alexander Bazovský - 1899 -1968, Slovak National Gallery, Bratislava, Slovakia, 1999
Miloš Alexander Bazovský - 1899 -1968, Turiec Gallery, Martin, Slovakia, 1999
Miloš Alexander Bazovský - 1899 -1968, Gallery of M. A. Bazovsky, Trenčín, Slovakia, 1999
Miloš Alexander Bazovský, The Slovak Institute in Budapest, Bratislava, Slovakia, 2009
Miloš Alexander Bazovský, Jan Koniarek Gallery, Trnava, Slovakia, 2010

Selected group exhibitions
IV Bienal Do Museu De Arte Moderna De São Paulo, Sao Paulo, Brazil, 1957
33rd Venice Biennale, Venice, Italy, 1966
50 let československého malířství 1918 - 1968, Valdštejnská jízdárna, Prague, Italy, 1968

Further reading
Cincík, J.: Miloš A. Bazovský. Outlines. Martin, 1945
Vaculík, K.: Miloš Bazovský. Bratislava 1958
Vaculík, K.: Miloš Alexander Bazovský. Bratislava 1967
Brezová, L.: Personal Bibliography of M. A. Bazovský. Matica slovenská, Martin 1990

External links
 Works held in Slovak art collections
Biography and Resource
Biography and Selection of Works
Slovakian Stamp
 Galéria Miloša Alexandra Bazovského v Trencíne (Miloš Alexander Bazovský Gallery) at Google Cultural Institute

1899 births
1968 deaths
People from Martin District
Slovak painters
20th-century Slovak painters